Perrotia gillias is a butterfly in the family Hesperiidae. It is found in eastern Madagascar (Nosy Be). The habitat consists of forests.

References

Butterflies described in 1878
Erionotini
Butterflies of Africa
Taxa named by Paul Mabille